Four steamships operated by Hamburg-Amerikanische Packetfahrt Aktien-Gesellschaft carried the name Thuringia.

, sold in 1878 to Russia
, abandoned in 1897, later sold by underwriters
, in service 1906–14, seized by Uruguay
, in service 1923–30, renamed General San Martin

Other ships named Thuringia were
, a  ship
, a 399 GRT trawler built by Cochrane & Sons, Selby as Rockflower.

Ship names